Cyndi Munson (born May 24, 1985) is an American politician from Oklahoma. She is a Democratic member of the Oklahoma House of Representatives, representing the 85th district since 2015. She won a special election to replace David Dank with over 54% of the vote.

Early life and education 
Munson was born in Monterey, California and raised in Lawton, Oklahoma. Munson's father was a member of the military. Munson earned a Bachelor of Arts degree in political science from the University of Central Oklahoma and Master of Science in leadership education from the University of Nebraska–Lincoln. As an undergraduate, Munson participated in a program in non-profit and voluntary services at Georgetown University.

Career 
Prior to entering politics, Munson has worked as a non-profit executive. Munson was elected to the Oklahoma House of Representatives in 2015, the first Asian-American to serve in the Oklahoma Legislature. In 2019, Munson was selected to serve on the Oversight Committee for the Legislative Office for Fiscal Transparency. In 2022, Munson succeeded Emily Virgin as minority leader of the Oklahoma House of Representatives.

References

1985 births
21st-century American politicians
21st-century American women politicians
Asian American and Pacific Islander state legislators in Oklahoma
Democratic Party members of the Oklahoma House of Representatives
Georgetown University alumni
Living people
People from Lawton, Oklahoma
People from Monterey, California
University of Nebraska–Lincoln alumni
University of Central Oklahoma alumni
Women state legislators in Oklahoma